Healthware International (HWI) is a global consulting agency specialized in healthcare communications.

History

The company was founded on 1996 as Healthware Consulting in Naples, Italy, by the entrepreneur Roberto Ascione. After some years of life, Healthware moved to Salerno, in order to leverage the near proximity of the Informatics and Communication Sciences schools of the University of Salerno as a source of qualified personnel. Healthware successively became a part of Saatchi & Saatchi Healthcare (Saatchi & Saatchi network of agencies). As a member of the network, Healthware focused its business on R&D of digital programs and tools.

On 2010, Healthware rebranded as Publicis Healthware International (PHI) after merging with Publicis eHealth Solutions, another Publicis company, made independent from S&SH and a full member of  Publicis Healthcare Communications Group; furthermore, it acquired the German company Digital District, based in Düsseldorf. On the same year, the iMed Studios agency of New York City merged under the PHI brand. From the merging two main operational hubs generated, the USA-based one, based in Madison Avenue, New York; and the EMEA one, based in Salerno. Subsidiaries were based in Rome, Milan, Düsseldorf, Paris, Yardley (PA) and Ames, (IA). More subsidiaries were planned to be open in Shanghai, in the United Kingdom and in Brasil.

Between 2010-2012, PHI merged in a number of other units, and in 2012 changed its name in Razorfish Healthware. In 2015, it successfully spun out from Publicis Groupe, maintaining its global headquarters in Salerno and regional offices in London, Singapore, Rome, Milan.

On February 14, 2017, it was announced the partnership with the US-based agency Intouch Solutions, which formed a global joint-venture in the field of digital health communications and consulting.

Operations

The HWI team, still led by the founder Roberto Ascione, is made up of more than 150 digital professionals, based in the global headquarters and regional offices.

Present operations are organized into three business units, consulting, communications and technology.

The consulting area supports the process of business transformation, made possible by advanced technologies, and offers specialized services in the fields of process consulting, change management, strategy and UX design.

The communications business unit delivers the realization of digital strategies and projects for pharmaceutical industries such as digital marketing (mobile and web), Closed loop marketing, CRM, e-learning, e-science, health 2.0, KOL management and multichannel delivery, and specific services for institutional clients like Hospitals, Scientific Societies, Health Institutions, as well as FMCG industries.

The technology area ensures the development capability and the technological implementation of communication programs together with the realization of platforms, business solutions and proprietary tools to increase the deployment of the digital tactics.

Awards

Healthware International was awarded in several national and international events, including Telly Awards, Global Awards, WebAwards, W3 Awards, the Rx Club Awards, the Healthcare Communication & Marketing Association Awards, eContent Italy Awards, Aurora Awards, Comp Awards. The company won the Merit Award at Web Health Awards, a competition where the best projects in the field of healthcare information are awarded via the web, on 2011, 2012 and 2014 (two assignations).

On July 8, 2011 the company has been included in the list of 75 major global agencies in the field of healthcare communications.

References

External links
Official website

Companies of Italy
Advertising agencies of Italy
Companies established in 1996